Medora is an unincorporated community in Reno County, Kansas, United States.  It is located northeast of Hutchinson  next to K-61 highway.

History
Medora had a post office from 1878 until 1988, but the post office was called Leslie until 1887.

Education
The community is served by Buhler USD 313 public school district.

References

Further reading

External links
 Reno County maps: Current, Historic, KDOT

Unincorporated communities in Reno County, Kansas
Unincorporated communities in Kansas
1878 establishments in Kansas
Populated places established in 1878